The 1961 DFB-Pokal Final decided the winner of the 1960–61 DFB-Pokal, the 18th season of Germany's knockout football cup competition. It was played on 13 September 1961 at the Glückauf-Kampfbahn in Gelsenkirchen. Werder Bremen won the match 2–0 against 1. FC Kaiserslautern, to claim their 1st cup title.

Route to the final
The DFB-Pokal began with 16 teams in a single-elimination knockout cup competition. There were a total of three rounds leading up to the final. Teams were drawn against each other, and the winner after 90 minutes would advance. If still tied, 30 minutes of extra time was played. If the score was still level, a replay would take place at the original away team's stadium. If still level after 90 minutes, 30 minutes of extra time was played. If the score was still level, a drawing of lots would decide who would advance to the next round.

Note: In all results below, the score of the finalist is given first (H: home; A: away).

Match

Details

References

External links
 Match report at kicker.de 
 Match report at WorldFootball.net
 Match report at Fussballdaten.de 

SV Werder Bremen matches
1. FC Kaiserslautern matches
1960–61 in German football cups
1961
Sports competitions in Gelsenkirchen
20th century in Gelsenkirchen
September 1961 sports events in Europe